The 1840 United States presidential election in Alabama took place between October 30 and December 2, 1840, as part of the 1840 United States presidential election. Voters chose seven representatives, or electors to the Electoral College, who voted for President and Vice President.

Alabama voted for the Democratic candidate, Martin Van Buren, over Whig candidate William Henry Harrison. Van Buren won Alabama by a margin of 8.76%. As of 2020, this remains the only time in American history that Alabama has voted for a different presidential candidate than neighboring Mississippi.

Results

See also
United States presidential elections in Alabama

References

Alabama
1840
1840 Alabama elections